Rytis Leliūga (born 4 January 1987) is a Lithuanian footballer who currently plays as a midfielder (association football) for FK Jelgava.

Leliūga is from Lithuania, whose national team he has represented at Under-18 level. He signed professional terms with Exeter at the beginning of the 2005/06 season and is a midfielder. He was released by Exeter City and signed for Norwegian club Bryne.

After being released by Exeter he had a trial (1. week of July 2006) at Norwegian 1. div club Bryne FK and signed a contract until the end of the season. However, in January 2007 he was persuaded to switch to Danish side Herfølge BK by fellow Lithuanian Aurelijus Skarbalius, who is the manager of the club. He left the club in 2010.

In April 2012 he signed for the Norwegian club Gjøvik FF, where he played till July. In July 2012 Leliūga joined the Latvian Higher League club Liepājas Metalurgs. In August 2012 Leliūga was named the best Latvian Higher League player of the month. All in all he participated in 25 matches, scoring 8 goals for Metalurgs, 20 and 8 of those, respectively, were achieved in the Latvian Higher League. On 21 December 2012 Leliūga moved to the Lithuanian A Lyga side Žalgiris Vilnius.

References

1987 births
Living people
Lithuanian footballers
Exeter City F.C. players
Herfølge Boldklub players
HB Køge players
FK Liepājas Metalurgs players
FK Žalgiris players
Lithuanian expatriate footballers
Expatriate men's footballers in Denmark
Expatriate footballers in England
Expatriate footballers in Estonia
Expatriate footballers in Latvia
Expatriate footballers in Norway
People from Mažeikiai
Lithuanian expatriate sportspeople in Denmark
Lithuanian expatriate sportspeople in England
Lithuanian expatriate sportspeople in Estonia
Lithuanian expatriate sportspeople in Latvia
Lithuanian expatriate sportspeople in Norway
FC Šiauliai players
JK Sillamäe Kalev players
Meistriliiga players
Association football midfielders